Rairakhol railway station is a railway station on the East Coast Railway network in the state of Odisha, India. It serves Rairakhol town. Its code is RAIR. It has two platforms. Passenger, Express and Superfast trains halt at Rairakhol railway station.

Major trains

 Puri–Ahmedabad Weekly Express
 Puri–Durg Express
 Rourkela–Gunupur Rajya Rani Express
 Tapaswini Express
 Puri–Ajmer Express
 Puri–Jodhpur Express
 Bikaner–Puri Express
 Howrah–Sambalpur Superfast Express
 Sambalpur–Puri Intercity Express
 Rourkela–Bhubaneswar Intercity Express
 Bhubaneswar–Bolangir Intercity Superfast Express
 Hirakud Express
 Bhubaneswar–Anand Vihar Weekly Superfast Express

See also
 Sambalpur district

References

Railway stations in Sambalpur district
Sambalpur railway division